Lake Lackawanna was created by the removal of fill material for the creation of Lubber Run Fill on the Lackawanna Cut-Off in northwest New Jersey, United States.  The lake is fed by Lubbers Run, which was dammed when this section of the Cut-Off was constructed during the years 1908–1911.

External links

Lackawanna
Lackawanna
Byram Township, New Jersey